Macriani is the name of three Roman usurpers - a father and two sons - who tried to gain the Roman throne from Emperor Gallienus. All three died in 261 A.D. They were:

Macrianus Major, the father
Macrianus Minor, first son
Quietus, second son

3rd-century Roman usurpers
Crisis of the Third Century